Giovanna Petrenga (born 6 July 1956) is an Italian Senator from Brothers of Italy.

References 

Living people
1956 births
21st-century Italian women politicians
Forza Italia (2013) politicians
Brothers of Italy politicians
Deputies of Legislature XVI of Italy
Deputies of Legislature XVII of Italy
Senators of Legislature XVIII of Italy
20th-century Italian women
Senators of Legislature XIX of Italy
Women members of the Chamber of Deputies (Italy)
Women members of the Senate of the Republic (Italy)